The High Council of Regency was a political collegial body that served as the de facto head of state of Albania in two separate time periods:

 The High Regency Council of the Principality of Albania from January 30, 1920 until January 31, 1925
 The High Regency Council of the Albanian Kingdom from October 25, 1943 until October 25, 1944
 
During the first period, the High Council acted on behalf of Prince Wilhelm of Wied, who despite having fled the country on 3 September 1914, was still considered legally the head of the Albanian State until 31 January 1925, when Ahmet Zogu declared Albania a republic.

During the second period, the High Council exercised the duties of the head of state and government when, after the capitulation of Italy, Albania was re-proclaimed independent and the 1928 constitution was re-recognized.

High Council of Regency in the Principality of Albania
The Congress of Lushnjë reaffirmed the monarchy as the form of the regime but until the quandary created by the prince's departure was to be resolved, the regency decided in the establishment of a temporary governing power named the "High Council", consisting of representatives from the four main religions of the country.
 
The Canonincal Basis of Lushnje defined the functions of the High Council which was obliged by law to approve every project proposals that were to be presented by the government and confirmed by the Senate (legislative body). The council had the authority, in case of a political crisis within the government, to choose a prime minister for the formation of a new cabinet. It could recall a meeting of the legislature when the prime minister was not confirmed in 3 consecutive voting sessions by the Senate.  The council had no authority to dissolve the Senate, even if there were born disagreements between senators. The national assembly could terminate the council's tenure and dissolve the Senate. In the event of the resignation of one councilor, three other councilors carried on with their duties. When two councilors were absent, the Senate would elect two others. Elected members of the council swore their oath of office in the following way:

Members

From 2 July 1924 until 24 December 1924, Fan Noli was acting head of the High Council.

High Council of Regency in the Albanian Kingdom
The High Council of Regency was formed by a special parliament law on October 21, 1943, as a temporary collegial body that replaced the King for as long as he was not physically present in the country. The council had the rights of the head of state and was in charge of the General Command of the Armed Forces, the appointment of employees at the top ladder of state institutions, the decreeing of laws, treaties, etc. The council had no executive powers to declare war without the approval of the Parliament, except only in instances of self-defence by an invading foreign enemy. 
The post of the chairman of the council rotated for a period of 3 months but only Mehdi Frashëri fully exercised this duty. Other attributes were exercised according to the Statute of December 1, 1928.

On October 25, 1943, the National Assembly elected as members of the council: Mehdi Frashëri, Lef Nosi, Fuad Dibra and father Anton Harapi. 
The latter was present in all the meetings held, but took the oath on January 13, 1944, after having received the Pope's permission at the beginning of December 1943.

Members

See also
 History of Albania

References

Albanian politicians